
Year 741 (DCCXLI) was a common year starting on Sunday (link will display the full calendar) of the Julian calendar. The denomination 741 for this year has been used since the early medieval period, when the Anno Domini calendar era became the prevalent method in Europe for naming years.

Events 
 By place 

 Byzantine Empire 
 June 18 – Emperor Leo III ("the Isaurian") dies of dropsy at Constantinople, after a 24-year reign that has saved the Byzantine Empire and delivered Eastern Europe from the threat of an Arab conquest. He is succeeded by his son Constantine V.
 Artabasdos, Byzantine general (strategos) of the Armeniac theme, defeats Constantine V and advances on Constantinople, where he is crowned emperor. He secures the support of the themes of Thrace and Opsikion, and abandons Leo's religious policy of iconoclasm. Constantine seeks the support of the Anatolic theme.

 Central America 
February 11 – Wak Chanil Ajaw (Lady Six Sky), queen of the Mayan city state of Naranjo in Guatemala, dies after a reign of more than 47 years and is succeeded by her son, Yax Mayuy Chan Chaak, who reigns until his own death in 744.
June 23 – Kʼawiil Chan Kʼinich becomes the new ruler of the Mayan city state at Dos Pilas in Guatemala after the death of Ucha'an K'in B'alam and reigns until 761 when he is forced to flee during an uprising by rebels from Tamarindito.

 Europe 
 October 22 – Charles Martel, Merovingian mayor of the palace, dies in his palace at Quirzy-sur-Oise (modern-day Picardy). His territories are divided between his adult sons Carloman and Pepin the Short, although the Frankish Kingdom has had no true king since the death of Theuderic IV (see 737). Lands to the east, including Austrasia and Alemannia (with Bavaria as a vassal) go to Carloman, while Pepin receives Neustria and Burgundy (with Aquitaine as a vassal). Grifo, youngest son of Charles, succeeds him as mayor of the palace, and probably receives a strip of land between Neustria and Austrasia.
 Pepin the Short marries Bertrada of Laon, daughter of Count Charibert of Laon. 

 Switzerland 
 In 741 and 744, documents in the archives of St. Gallen Abbey describe the village of Kempraten as Centoprato, another document in 863 as Centiprata, inspired by the Latin name Centum Prata.
 A nunnery given by the Alamannic noblewoman Beata on Lützelau island is first mentioned. In 744, the nunnery is sold to Einsiedeln Abbey.
 Ufenau island in Switzerland is first mentioned in 741 as "Hupinauia", and in 744 as "Ubinauvia" — island of Huppan of Huphan.

 Africa 
 The Great Berber Revolt: Caliph Hisham ibn Abd al-Malik appoints Kulthum ibn Iyad al-Qasi as governor (wali) of Ifriqiya (North Africa). A fourth expedition is sent from Syria by the Umayyad Caliphate to crush the rebellion in the Atlas region, but is defeated at the Battle of Bagdoura, in the plain of the Ghrab (modern Morocco). The counter-attack of the Kharijite rebels to the East is successful, but fails to conquer Kairouan from the loyalists. A more radical branch of the Tunisian Kharijites, (the Sufrists) however, manages to take the city soon after.

 By topic 

 Religion 
 November 28 – Pope Gregory III dies at Rome, after a 10-year reign. He is succeeded by Zachary, as the 91st pope of the Catholic Church.
 April 23 – A fire destroys the English city of York Minster, including its Church. The church is later rebuilt as a more impressive structure, containing thirty altars.
 Japanese authorities decree that Buddhist temples should be established throughout the country (approximate date).

Births 
 Amalberga of Temse, Lotharingian nun and saint (d. 772)
 Sugano no Mamichi, Japanese nobleman (d. 814)
 Tassilo III, duke of Bavaria (approximate date)

Deaths 
 February 10 or 11 - Lady Six Sky, Maya queen of Naranjo
 March 28 – Hatsusebe, Japanese princess
 June 18 – Leo III, emperor of the Byzantine Empire
 October 22 – Charles Martel, Frankish statesman and founder of the Carolingian Dynasty
 November 28 – Gregory III, pope of the Catholic Church
 Habib ibn Abi Obeida al-Fihri, Arab general
 Hedan II, duke of Thuringia (approximate date)
 Kulthum ibn Iyad al-Qasi, Arab governor
 Theodoald, mayor of the palace of Austrasia

References

Sources